Coyote attacks are events where coyotes attack humans. While uncommon and rarely cause serious injuries, they have been increasing in frequency, especially in the state of California. Although media reports of such attacks generally identify the animals in question as simply "coyotes", the perpetrators of some attacks may have been hybrids known as coywolves.

Description and background
Coyote attacks on humans are uncommon events and rarely cause serious injuries, but have been increasing in frequency, especially in the state of California. In the 30 years leading up to March 2006, at least 160 attacks occurred in the United States, mostly in the Los Angeles County area. Data from the USDA's Wildlife Services, the California Department of Fish and Wildlife, and other sources show that while 41 attacks occurred during the period of 1988–1997, 48 attacks were verified from 1998 through 2003. The majority of these incidents occurred in Southern California near the suburban-wildland interface.

Coyotes are losing their fear of humans, which is further worsened by people intentionally or unintentionally feeding coyotes. In such situations, some coyotes have begun to act aggressively toward humans, chasing joggers and bicyclists, confronting people walking their dogs, and stalking small children.

Although media reports of such attacks generally identify the animals in question as simply "coyotes", research into the genetics of the eastern coyote indicates those involved in attacks in northeast North America, including Pennsylvania, New York, New England, and Eastern Canada,   may have actually been coywolves, hybrids of Canis latrans and not fully coyotes.

List of attacks

Fatal attacks
Two fatal coyote attacks on humans  have been confirmed by  experts:
 On August 26, 1981, a  coyote grabbed a three-year-old  girl  named Kelly Keen in the driveway of her father's home in Glendale, California, United States, and dragged her across the road.  Her father rescued her by chasing the animal away and rushed her to Adventist Health Medical Center, but she died in surgery due to blood loss and a broken neck.
 On October 27, 2009, two eastern coyotes mauled the 19-year-old singer-songwriter Taylor Mitchell at Cape Breton Highlands National Park in Nova Scotia, Canada.  She was on a break from her concert tour when they stalked and chased her down the Skyline Trail. An air ambulance airlifted Taylor to Queen Elizabeth II Health Sciences Centre, but she died a few hours later after midnight from severe injuries and blood loss that were sustained during the attack.

Non-fatal attacks

On children

While their bushy hair can make them look quite large, coyotes rarely weigh more than 15 kg (35 lbs.).  Also, unlike some other canids, such as wolves and dogs, they are relatively less apt to hunt in packs large enough to take down a full-grown adult human being. Thus, coyote attacks tend to be a greater threat to children than they are to adults.

Non-fatal coyote attacks on minors in California (1978–2003)
A study published in 2004 documented 35 incidents in which a minor escaped likely "serious or fatal injury" if the minor had not been rescued. These included:
 In May 1979, a young  coyote grabbed the throat and cheek of a 2-year-old Pasadena  daughter  who had been eating cookies on her  mom's  porch.
 In July 1979, in Pasadena,   an urban  coyote lacerated the leg of a 17-year-old girl who was attempting to save her dog from being attacked by a coyote.
 In August, 1979, a coyote attacked a 5-year-old La Verne girl.   Her father and a  neighbor saved the girl from being dragged into the bushes.
 In July 1980, in Agoura Hills a 13-month-old girl was grabbed and dragged off by a coyote. She suffered puncture wounds to midsection before being saved by mother.
 In August 1988, a coyote nipped and bruised a 4-year-old Oceanside boy who had been playing in his yard.
 In August 1988, in Oceanside, an 8-yr-old girl was approached by coyote while roller-skating after she had fallen.  The coyote tugged at her skate, and was scared off by two women who threw rocks.
 In August 1988, a coyote in Oceanside grabbed a 3-yr-old girl by the leg and pulled her down, then bit her on head and neck. Coyote chased off by mother and neighbors.
 In June 1990, in Reds Meadow, a 5-yr-old girl was attacked and bitten in the head while in sleeping bag at campground
 In May 1992, a coyote attacked a 5-year-old San Clemente daughter, biting her several times on her back.  The girl then climbed her swing set to escape, and her mom chased the coyote off.
 In October 1992, in Fallbrook, a coyote bit a 10-year-old boy on the head while he was asleep on back porch of a residence.
 In March 1995, in Griffith Park, a 5-year-old girl was knocked down twice by a coyote before being saved by her mother.
 In March 1995, a coyote stalked and then knocked down 5-yr-old girl twice.  Her mother rescued the child.
 In June 1995, a coyote chased three boys on University of California, Riverside property, biting a 7-year-old.
 In July 1995, a Griffith Park coyote was chased away once, but returned and bit the leg of a 15-month-old girl.
 In September 1995, a coyote attacked a 3-year-old Fullerton girl in her yard, biting her face, head and thigh.
 In November 1995, a coyote at University of California, Riverside chased playing children, biting a 3-year-old boy.
 In June 1996, in Los Altos, a coyote grabbed 3-yr-old boy by hand and dragged him toward bushes.  The child was treated for bites on scalp and hand.  The boy's 15-yr-old brother scared the coyote away.
 In February 1997, in South Lake Tahoe, a 4-yr-old girl in a yard was attacked and severely bitten.  Her heavy snowsuit protected all but her face.  Her father rescued the child.  The coyote stayed in the unfenced yard until shot by police.
 In May 2000, in La Mesa, a 3-year-old boy was bitten on his side, resulting in 4 puncture wounds.
 In June 2001, in Northridge, a 7-year-old girl was attacked and seriously injured by a coyote, despite mother's attempts to fight off the coyote.
 In July 2001, in Irvine, a 3-yr-old boy was bitten by a coyote in the leg while playing in yard.  The attack was interrupted by his father, who was 10-20 feet away at the time of the bite.
 In October 2001, in San Clemente, a coyote attacked children on a schoolyard.  An 8-yr-old girl bitten on the back of her neck and scratched.  A 7-yr-old boy was bitten on his back and arm.  A third student was attacked, but the coyote bit his backpack.
 In November 2001, in San Diego, a coyote that a family had been feeding at their apartment bit their 8-year-old daughter.
 In December 2001, in San Gabriel, a coyote bit a 3-year-old girl in the head, grabbed her shoulder and started to drag her away, but was chased off by her father.
 In May 2002, in Anza-Borrego State Park, a coyote bit a boy, who was sleeping in a sleeping bag, on the head.
 In May 2003, in Highland, a coyote came into a neighbor's garage chasing after 2-year-old girl, biting her on the arm.
 In July 2003, in Granada Hills, a boy was walking his family's two dogs when they were attacked by three coyotes. One dog was killed and the other injured before they were rescued by his father.
 In August 2003, in Apple Valley, a coyote attacked a 4-year-old boy on a golf course, biting him on the face and neck before he was saved by his father.

Non-fatal coyote attacks on minors in California after 2003
 On June 28, 2010, a coyote jumped on a 12-year-old girl in Spring Valley. The girl fell backwards and injured her elbow, but she was not bitten.
 On July 18, 2013, at Forest Lawn Cemetery in Cypress, a 2-year-old girl was attacked by a coyote while playing about ten feet away from her mother, who was visiting her grandmother's grave.  The coyote grabbed the playing child and started to drag her off into the bushes, but dropped the child and ran away when "lunged at" by the mother.  The child was hospitalized for a 2.5 inch gash to the leg and began precautionary treatment for rabies.  Authorities killed three coyotes at the cemetery later that day.  On October 9, the mother filed suit alleging that the cemetery, by not warning her of the risk, had liability.
 On November 16, 2014, a woman claimed that her 4-year-old daughter was knocked down by a coyote outside her Hollywood home. After the attack, the California Department of Fish and Wildlife investigated but couldn't find any coyote, and a local television news program described the attack as "alleged".
 On December 25, 2014, a boy was bitten in an attack by an apparently sick coyote. He was saved by his father.  Before the attack, about a block away, the coyote had just bitten the leg of a man walking his children to his car outside a home.  After the attack, the coyote chased and bit a jogger on a nearby street but ran away when kicked; the police arrived and shot the coyote, which tested negative for rabies.
 On January 12, 2015, in Ladera Ranch, outside a baby girl's residence, a coyote with a limp tried to attack and grab the girl from her mother's arms.  The mother fought the animal off enough to get inside to safety.  After the attack, the animal killed two dogs and was being pursued by authorities.
 On May 22, 2015, in Irvine, a 3-year-old girl was picking up after their dog that she, her twin sister, and her mother had been walking, when a coyote ran out of a hedge and bit at the back of her neck, but was saved by her mother and other nearby adults.  After the attack, the Department of Fish and Wildlife were trying to track and trap the coyote and planning educational programs to educate residents how to prevent and behave properly during coyote encounters.  Before the attack, a coyote had chased another girl in the area.
 On May 22, 2015, in Irvine at Silverado Park, a 2-year-old girl, was in her garage when the door was opened and an urban coyote in the driveway came in and bit her on the neck and cheek.
 On October 14, 2015, in Irvine, a 31-year-old man and his 3-year-old son were attacked by a coyote while they were in a garden.
 On July 22, 2016, a coyote bit a 17-year-old girl on her leg at Grant Rea Park in Montebello.
 On October 9, 2016, an urban coyote bit a six-year-old boy who was playing in Irvine's Springbrook Park. The boy's father along with bystanders shouted at it and one woman threw sand.
 On March 15, 2018, a five-year-old boy in Los Angeles was bitten by an urban coyote on the California State University campus. Police officers shot it on the day after this incident.
 On April 1, 2020, an urban coyote mauled a five-year-old girl who was visiting Dublin Hills Regional Park with her family. She was hospitalized in Oakland.
 On July 9, 2020, a two-year-old boy in Moraga was bitten by an urban coyote on the leg near the park's restrooms.
 On March 12, 2021, it was announced that the California Department of Fish and Wildlife had captured and euthanized a coyote that had attacked five people (two of which were children) in the towns of Moraga and Lafayette since July of that year.
 On August 21, 2021, an urban coyote pursued a four-year-old girl in San Diego's suburb Chula Vista. Her father successfully chased it away. Her parents transported her to Rady Children's Hospital.
 On April 28, 2022, an urban coyote mauled a two-year-old girl at Huntington beach several feet away from her mother, she was bit on the face but survived and was transported to the hospital by ambulance. The coyote was tracked down and found hiding under a trailer home where it was killed. The attack was captured on video.

Non-fatal coyote attacks on children outside of California
 On December 17, 1997, coyotes bit two children in Scottsdale, Arizona. Neither child had serious injuries.
 On July 29, 1998, a four-year-old boy was mauled by a coyote while playing in the backyard of his home in Sandwich, Massachusetts on Cape Cod. His mother beat the coyote on the head to drive it off. A responding police officer pursued the animal into the woods and shot it.
 In April 2006, two coyotes bit two young children in Bellevue, Washington. The coyotes were euthanized afterwards.
 On April 6, 2007, in Middletown, New Jersey, a coyote bit a twenty-two month old boy who was playing in his family yard with a friend.
 On May 21, 2007, a coyote jumped out from a small line of bushes and bit a 5-year-old as he and his sister walked home from a neighbor's house in Middletown, New Jersey.  He survived due to his sister's scream when she saw the incident, but needed 46 stitches in the back of his head and rabies shots.
 On December 4, 2008, a nine-year-old boy in Erie, Colorado was snowboarding with his six-year-old brother on a golf course behind his house when  a coyote attacked him.  He used the snowboard to fend off the attack, but was bitten on the arm. A coyote in the area was then killed, but it wasn't clear if that was the same one that had bitten the boy, so he began a course of treatment for rabies.
 In June 2010, a 3-year-old girl and a 6-year-old girl were attacked and seriously injured in separate attacks by urban coyotes in Rye, New York. The six-year-old was attacked by two coyotes on June 25 and the three-year-old was attacked by one coyote on June 29. There was no indication the animals were rabid, but the girls were given treatment as a precaution.
 On April 15, 2011, a coyote bit a two-year-old girl on the neck at a regional park playground in Cave Creek, Arizona. Her parents took her to a hospital for rabies treatment afterwards.
 During a period of two months, from July to September, 2011, three children between the ages of two and six were bitten by a coyote, and a fourth was approached by a coyote within two feet in a neighborhood of Broomfield, Colorado. All four encounters are thought to have involved the same adult male coyote, who was lethally removed after the last attack.
 On August 24, 2011, before noon, a two-year-old Weymouth, Massachusetts girl was walking next to her stroller with her grandmother when a coyote lunged out of some hedges along the sidewalk in a suburban residential area.  The animal attacked from behind, knocked the child down, and bit her on the back of her head, leaving a somewhat large wound.  The grandmother was having trouble saving her from the coyote, when a neighbor came out of a nearby house and got the pair into the house, shutting the coyote outside, where it stayed, listening, while the homeowner dialed 911. The girl was taken to the hospital to have her scalp stitched.  The authorities hunted the coyote but finding nothing, called off the hunt, but later that night police were called back to the area by calls that the coyote had returned.  They shot the animal, and although it escaped, it was presumed to have been fatally wounded, but the body was not found, so the girl began a course of rabies treatments.  One week earlier, a coyote in the same area tried to attack a landscaper, who successfully fended the animal off, sustaining no injury, so the area coyotes had not been hunted or trapped.
 On October 12, 2011, in Saginaw, Texas the Star-Telegram Deanna Boyd reported that a 3-year-old boy was about to get into the car Wednesday morning for his daily ride to day care and spilled his Cheerios. His mother dashed back inside the house to refill the bowl then heard a scream and ran back outside where she found the boy lying on the ground confronted by a coyote.  The toddler, Colton, said he had seen it "coming too fast" and that it had "knocked me over." He suffered a scratch or welt on his right hand that did not break the skin. The coyote turned its attention to the mother and then the father who came out of the house and shot the coyote, which tested negative for rabies.
 On June 22, 2012, at Nehalem Bay State Park on the coast of Oregon, a coyote attacked a 5-year-old girl who was following her family back from the beach on a sand path through beachgrass.  The coyote first grabbed a stick which the girl had been trailing behind her, then "lunged at" the screaming child, nipping at her ribcage and feet and breaking the skin on her back, before cutting off the attack to confront her father, who succeeded in driving the determined coyote off.  The coyote was not caught, so the child began precautionary treatments for rabies.
 In the evening of March 12, 2013, two young boys in Boulder, Colorado were playing near a creek some distance away from their father, when they were surrounded by two coyotes.  The boy who did not run was not bitten, but the five-year-old who ran toward his father was bitten on the leg before being saved by his father.  Before this incident, the city had been having problematic encounters with coyotes for some time in the area, known as Boulder Creek Path, including attacks on adults, so they had instituted and just completed a four-week "hazing program" to instill fear of humans into the animals.  After the incident, officials hunted down and killed two coyotes believed to be the same ones that had bitten the boy.
 On May 16, 2013, between six and seven PM, a two-year-old girl in Goose Gossage Park, Colorado Springs, Colorado, was playing on the slide with her mother and her brother.  She came down the slide, her mother caught her, and set her aside, and just in the brief moment when her mom turned to catch her brother, a coyote bit the girl by the head and ran away.  Doctors used stitches to close a large gash just over her right eye, and staples to close the gashes on the back of her head.   The animal was not caught, so she began a course of rabies treatments. In the aftermath of this and the second attack, below, authorities conducted a large scale hunt for the animal, which resulted in the death of two adult animals. Also, the media printed criticism from area residents that the authorities had been slow to act to their complaints and warnings that the animals were dangerous.  Authorities were quoted as saying that hunting or trapping would not help because other coyotes would take their place, and that the state "wasn't interested" in spending the money.
 On May 16, 2013, within an hour before the above attack and in the same place, a coyote had attacked a four-year-old girl, knocking her down and biting her on the backside, tearing her clothes. Authorities thought it was probably the same animal, and planned to kill it.
 On October 27, 2013, a three-year-old boy in the Austin neighborhood of Chicago, Illinois within an alley was bitten by an animal badly enough to require plastic surgery. The authorities suspected a coyote, and trapped "a handful" in the area.
 On May 22, 2017, a coyote in Stillwater, Oklahoma assaulted an eight-year-old girl in the backyard of her family's home.
 On July 4, 2017, a one-year-old boy was bitten by a coyote in Hastings, Nebraska. His family was lighting fireworks at the time of the incident. He was subsequently taken to the emergency room for rabies shots.
 On November 17, 2017, a twelve-year-old boy in Bainbridge Island, Washington was assaulted by a coyote when he was walking his two dogs. The pack of 6 coyotes took one of the dogs, but the child ran home with the other. Later, he found scratch marks on his door.
 On December 3, 2017, a coyote bit a three-year-old girl's left arm in Snoqualmie, Washington. She was outside with her father on the front porch of their home. Her father was up on the ladder hanging Christmas lights when the animal prowled into their neighborhood.
 On March 15, 2018, a nine-year-old girl and her family in Advance, North Carolina were making an attempt to enter their home when an urban coyote followed and assaulted her. Her mother fended off the animal.
 On April 29, 2018, a coyote in Mount Pleasant, New York charged at a five-year-old girl and bit her while she was visiting a park with her mother and brother. Her mother and an off-duty police officer fought against the animal. Other police officers subsequently arrived and shot it. The girl was taken to a hospital for rabies treatment, stitches, and antibiotics.
 On October 19, 2018, a coyote in Portland, Oregon leapt and scratched an eight-year-old girl who was playing outside her home after school.
 On October 23, 2018, a child in Elyria, Ohio was bitten by a coyote on Oakwood Elementary School's playground.
 On October 30, 2018, a coyote in Portland, Oregon bit a seven-year-old girl who was walking to her house after exiting a school bus. She was subsequently sent to a hospital for rabies vaccination.
 On November 1, 2018, an aggressive coyote in Frisco, Texas assaulted a nine-year-old child. His parent took the child to the hospital for rabies treatment.
 On June 13, 2019, a coyote in Fairfield, New Jersey mauled a thirty-four-year-old woman and her four-year-old son in Fairfield's recreational complex. They were transported to a nearby hospital for treatment.
 On September 24, 2019, a coyote in Chicago, Illinois stalked and chased a five-year-old girl in her front yard. It fled after the girl went into her house. The girl's family says she was frightened, but uninjured.
 On January 8, 2020, a five-year-old boy in Chicago, Illinois was mauled by a coyote a few times near Lincoln Park's Peggy Notebaert Nature Museum. The boy was subsequently stabilized in Lurie Children's Hospital.
 On January 20, 2020, a rabid coyote in Exeter, New Hampshire pounced on a two-year-old boy whose parents took him and his two siblings for a walk on a hiking trail near Judes Pond. His father successfully strangled it.
 On August 11, 2021, a three-year-old girl at North Herring Cove Beach in Provincetown, Massachusetts was mauled by a coyote. She was transported to Cape Cod Hospital afterwards.
 On August 15, 2021, a five-year-old boy in Arlington, Massachusetts was mauled on his leg by an urban coyote while playing in a sandbox. His family transported him to a hospital afterwards.
 On May 3, 2022, an urban coyote attacked a two-year-old boy on his porch in Dallas, Texas. The boy survived the attack and was transported to the hospital where he underwent surgery and ultimately made a recovery. State wildlife experts indicated that it was clear the coyote was being fed by the neighborhood. Four coyotes in the immediate area were killed in response.

Non-fatal coyote attacks on teenagers in other states 
 On August 6, 2010, in Port Aransas, Texas, Executive Lt. Darryl Johnson of the Port Aransas Police Department told Phil Reynolds of the South Jetty News that the latest coyote confrontation led to two Boys Scouts, 14 and 15 years old, from San Antonio, being bitten while sleeping outside their tent near Pole 3 on the beach. The boys were taken to a Corpus Christi Hospital where they were treated. The boys took preventive rabies shots.
 
 On February 22, 2012, a 17-year-old boy in Hopkinton, New Hampshire was attacked by a "possibly rabid" coyote while walking his dog in the woods near his house.  The coyote approached, the dog ran away, and the coyote attacked the boy, who stood his ground and punched until the animal ran off.  The boy was scratched by the animal's claws and possibly teeth and so began precautionary rabies treatments.
 On October 15, 2012,. KVUE  abc - KVUE.COM Heather Kovar reported a 14-year-old boy in Austin, Texas was knocked down by a coyote then attacked on a trail near his home. Neighbors say they have encountered aggressive coyotes. Texas Wildlife Services said they have received many reports of sightings and animal attacks. The teen has had a series of 11 rabies shots.
 In November 2013, a 15-year-old-girl in Johns Creek, Georgia was jogging in her neighborhood with her black Labrador-mix when a coyote chased her. She hit the coyote with her cellular phone, but fled while the two dogs fought against each other. The teenage girl knocked on her neighbor's door and called her father when she got inside her neighbor's home.
 On July 12, 2015, a 15-year-old boy in Grapevine, Texas was bitten by a coyote when he and his girlfriend were exiting a movie theater.
 On June 9, 2018, a 17-year-old boy in Swampscott, Massachusetts was mauled by a coyote in a forest. He was subsequently taken to North Shore Medical Center.

Non-fatal coyote attacks on children in Canada 
 On June 29, 2009, a 2-year-old girl in Port Coquitlam, British Columbia was active on a school playground when an urban coyote assaulted her. Adults around the school's vicinity rescued this girl and chased the animal away.
 On May 31, 2010, a 5-year-old girl in Vernon, British Columbia was mauled by an urban coyote while walking with her parents and dog near a greenbelt area at about 5pm.  An official quoted in the story stated that there had been four other attacks on humans in British Columbia in the preceding fifteen years.
 In January 2012, an 8-year-old girl in Oakville, Ontario was playing in her backyard with a friend when an urban coyote jumped over the fence and attacked her. The animal chased the children inside the house, then stalked around outside the house, but ran away before the police arrived.  Authorities killed a coyote found in the area later that day, and the girl was taken to a hospital, treated for bites to the leg, and given rabies shots because it was not clear whether the rabies-free animal that was killed was the same one which had attacked the child.
 On September 25, 2013, in St. Catharines, Ontario, a coyote attacked an 8-year-old girl who was walking on a sidewalk behind her stepfather, when the coyote leaped up at her, biting her ribcage.  He turned around and saw it biting her foot, and then her torso.  The girl was treated and released for "coyote bite."  The animal was not found, so she underwent a course of rabies treatment as a precaution.
 On June 26. 2015, two coyotes mauled an eleven-year-old girl in Valleyview, Alberta. Her mother sent her to a hospital for stitches.
 On June 26, 2017, a 4-year-old girl walking with her 6-year-old brother at Mary Jane Shannon Elementary School in Surrey, British Columbia was stalked by an urban coyote. A woman who was nearby honked her car's horn and screamed at the animal.
 On May 15, 2018, an urban coyote in Burnaby, British Columbia assaulted a 3-year-old boy who fell from the front gate of his home. The boy's mother called the emergency number while her partner and their neighbours came to his aid. The boy recovered with stitches in a hospital on the day after this incident.
 In late July 2018, urban coyotes in Ahuntsic-Cartierville (a borough within the city of Montreal) mauled a five-year-old boy, a five-year-old girl and a three-year-old girl with minor injuries.
 On May 6, 2019, an urban coyote in White Rock, British Columbia mauled a three-year-old girl on the back of her leg in Centennial Park. She was subsequently examined by health-care professionals and released to her family for recovery.
 On June 16, 2019, a coyote in Aurora, Ontario lunged at a two-year-old girl in a backyard. Her six-year-old brother fled, but her parents successfully frightened the animal away.
 On June 19, 2019, an urban coyote in Toronto, Ontario mauled an eight-year-old boy who was riding his bicycle within the Thorncliffe Park neighbourhood. He was subsequently sent to a hospital for a rabies vaccination.
 On April 20, 2020, an urban coyote in Edmonton, Alberta lunged at a two-year-old girl who was spending time outdoors with her grandfather at Coronation Park.
 On July 12, 2021, a two-year-old girl in British Columbia's Stanley Park was mauled by a coyote. She was transported to a hospital afterwards.
 On July 20, 2021, a ten-year-old girl in Toronto, Ontario was stalked by an urban coyote while walking with her Yorkshire terrier. The terrier successfully guarded her from being seriously mauled by the animal.

Non-fatal coyote attacks on teenagers in Canada 
 On July 14, 2003, a coyote bit an 18-year-old American girl on one of her arms while she was hiking with her parents on the Skyline Trail at Cape Breton Highlands National Park in Nova Scotia.
 On August 9, 2010, a coyote bit a sleeping 16-year-old girl's head twice in her tent while she was camping with her parents on the eastern end of Cape Breton Highlands National Park in Ingonish, Nova Scotia. She was taken to a hospital for stitches and treatment to prevent any rabies.
 On May 15, 2012, a 14-year-old boy in Westmount, Nova Scotia wore body armour, motocross pants and boots when a coyote attacked him on a trail near his home. All three protective gears helped him survive the predatory incident.
 On September 21, 2012, a 16-year-old girl was attacked by a coyote in New Waterford, Nova Scotia while she was walking to school.  She had heard some growling in the bushes, but, seeing nothing, continued walking and was hit from behind and knocked down.  Just at that moment, a car happened along, and the motorist sounded his horn, scaring the coyote away.  The Department of Natural Resources hired a professional to trap the animal.
 On June 27, 2021, an 18-year-old girl in Tuscany, Calgary, Alberta was mauled on her upper thigh by an urban coyote during her high school graduation party. She was transported to Foothills Medical Centre for rabies treatment afterwards.

On adults
Much of the published scholarly research on coyote attacks on adults comes from California, but press reports detail attacks all across the continent.

Non-fatal coyote attacks on adults in California (1979–2003)
Not all the coyote attacks on adults in California between 1979 and 2003 reported by Timm, et al. resulted in injury.  In some, bitten articles of clothing or backpacks show that injury was narrowly avoided.  In others, the attack was immediately broken off by the coyote once it could make off with an item the uninjured victim was carrying.  While several victims were hiking, working, or jogging in unpopulated areas, many occurred at the victim's own home.  Many appear to have been "test bites" on people who seemed incapacitated, but as soon as the victim reacted, the attack was abandoned. A selection of these attacks are listed below.  Some add context to one or more of the attacks on children listed above.   Many began as attacks on a person's pet, provoking sequential counter-attacks.

Non-fatal coyote attacks on adults in California after 2003 
 On August 6, 2016, an urban coyote mauled a man who was mending his car at Grant Rea Park in Montebello.
 On August 7, 2016, an urban coyote in Montebello mauled a homeless man rummaging garbage bags at Grant Rea Park an hour after midnight.
 On July 9, 2018, a male security guard in Escondido was on patrol at an apartment complex when a coyote mauled him. His boots successfully protected him from being severely wounded by the animal.
 On May 15, 2020, an urban coyote in Laguna Beach lunged at a ninety-one-year-old man who was lifting a newspaper from the driveway of his house. The man was sent to a hospital afterwards.
 On March 12, 2021, it was announced that the California Department of Fish and Wildlife had captured and euthanized a coyote that had attacked five people (two of which were children) in the towns of Moraga and Lafayette since July of that year.
 On August 12, 2022, an urban coyote mauled Dean Karnazes during a race in Marin Headlands. He successfully fended it off with a jogging pole.

Non-fatal coyote attacks on adults outside of California

Non-fatal coyote attacks on adults in other states 
 On May 22, 2008, 10:00am, in an unpopulated area of Maine, a hunter was hunting with a friend, staying hidden and using a turkey call, when he was  knocked down and bitten by a coyote.  His thick hunting clothing prevented more serious injury, but suffered several small puncture wounds and tooth scratches, and one of his teeth was damaged when he was knocked down.  The other hunter soon arrived, and the animal fled.  After the attack, the victim was treated at the hospital for his wounds and started a course of precautionary rabies treatments.
 In June, 2008, in the Shadow Wood area of the Brooks community of Estero, Florida, a woman was walking her dachshund on a short leash when an urban coyote suddenly appeared, grabbed the dog, and tried to run away with it.  She dropped to the ground, grabbed the severely injured dog, saving it from being carried off, but the coyote bit her on the right calf.  She was taken by ambulance to a hospital where she was treated for four puncture wounds and began precautionary treatment for rabies, as the animal could not be found and killed for rabies testing right away. The incident was preceded by coyotes regularly feeding on dogs in the area, and followed by authorities hiring a professional trapper to cull area coyotes.
 In January, 2010, in Greenburgh, New York, a woman was taking a daytime walk through a wooded park when she was pounced on by a coyote.   She screamed and, although she was aware that experts don't recommend it, she turned and ran as fast as she could and escaped, but not before she received puncture wounds and scrapes to her arms, legs, back, and buttocks.  The coyote later attacked a pit bull terrier at its home adjacent to the same park, was spotted and chased by a police helicopter, and plans were being made for policemen with hunting backgrounds to try to track down the animal.  The woman's wounds were treated and, although the coyote did not appear sick, she began a course of treatment for rabies.
 On May 22, 2010, a 24-year-old man sleeping on his friend's patio in Port Aransas, Texas was awakened by an urban coyote biting him four times in quick succession on the arm and hand.  When he stood, it retreated to the street, but stayed in the area, watching.  The man took a series of rabies shots as a precaution.
 On July 13, 2010, a man sleeping on a beach in Port Aransas, Texas was bitten by a coyote licking and biting his hand.  He completed a precautionary course of rabies treatments.
 On August 4, 2010, in Port Aransas, Texas, Port Aransas Animal Control Officer Jim Williams stated "In the 9 and a half year's I've been there, this is the worst I've ever seen it,"  when speaking to KRIS TV about a 19-year-old female from San Antonio, Texas that was bitten in the head by a coyote. The 19 year-old underwent rabies treatment in San Antonio.
 On December 25, 2010, in Dalton, Minnesota, a 48-year-old man walking his dog near a trailer court when an urban coyote attacked his domestic dog.  While defending the dog, he was bitten on both hands by the animal.
 January 23, 2011, Port Aransas, Texas, Corpus Christi Caller Times writer Mark Collette's article confirms a sixth person reported an urban coyote bite in Port Aransas. The man was sleeping on the beach when bitten by a coyote.  Police Chief Scott Burroughs said precautionary rabies vaccinations were received.
 In March 2012, a coyote bit two women and a man in Peoria, Arizona.
 In December 2012, in Kent, Washington, a man spent the night in the hospital after being attacked by a pack of coyotes in his own backyard.
 On Wednesday, December 12, 2012, at about 2:00am, in Waltham, Massachusetts, on the campus of Brandeis University, an animal, thought to be a coyote, attacked a student walking back to her dorm.  The animal appeared from dense cover and in a very dark location, and quickly disappeared, so the victim did not get a good look.  Multiple residents had sighted a pack of coyotes in the area.  The woman was treated for a tooth or claw wound.
 On the evening of October 8, 2012, a security guard was manning a booth at the Bingham Canyon Mine, Salt Lake County, Utah, when a coyote entered through an open door and attacked her. She managed to escape and call for backup, but not before she received defensive wounds to her forearm. The coyote was shot by a policeman and the victim was taken to the hospital for stitches. Results of rabies tests were not available at presstime.
 In October 2012, in Malabar, Florida, an 84-year-old woman was attacked by a rabid coyote when she tried to prevent it from getting in her chicken coop. She was taken to the hospital. Her daughter shot the coyote.
 In January 2013, in Boulder, Colorado, officials were trying to decide what to do about coyotes attacking joggers, bicyclists, and dogwalkers on a popular bike path along the Boulder Creek.  The jogger who was bitten at first stood her ground and acted aggressively toward the coyote, but then turned and tried to run away, and was then bitten on the ankle.
 In May, 2013, in Wrentham, Massachusetts, a woman was with her dog at night when it was attacked by a coyote.  The woman was bitten on the hand by the coyote while trying to save her dog.  The coyote was not caught, so the woman began treatment for possible rabies.
 In late June, 2013, residents of the Rocky Creek subdivision of eastern Wichita, Kansas received an email from the homeowners' association stating that an irrigation worker had been attacked by a coyote near a sidewalk west of a bridge.  The email stated that the attack resulted in torn clothing, not skin, but residents were warned to watch the area.
 On Monday, September 2, 2013, at 5:30pm, a man was waxing his car in the driveway of his home northwest of Cumming, Georgia, when he was painfully bitten by a coyote on the back of the left leg just above the knee.  He slapped the coyote with a towel, but the coyote kept attacking, but then the man's white German Shepherd came running and body-slammed the coyote. Both animals tumbled and ran off chasing each other.  The dog, "Charmin", returned without the coyote but with a bite wound to the back right leg. The man was treated for the bite and started a precautionary course of treatment for rabies, but the dog's vaccinations for the disease were current.
 On Monday, October 14, 2013, at about 5:00am, on a dark road just outside Niwot, Colorado in Boulder County, three coyotes attacked a 22-year-old man who was walking to work.  The attack lasted one or two minutes before the pack retreated.  The man concentrated on keeping his balance, wielding his flashlight with one arm and pushing the coyotes with the other, keeping the animals in front of him, protecting his neck and face, and retreating.  He landed at least one solid blow with his flashlight to the side of the head of one of the animals.  They circled, dodged, and attacked in turn, lunging at his throat, biting, clawing, and landing leaping body-blows.  He was treated and released for multiple bleeding cuts and abrasions to the arms, head, face, and neck.  Two days later, officials announced the three coyotes had been killed and that none of them were rabid.
 On Friday, November 1, 2013, about 11am, on a property near a country club on the north end of Mansfield, Ohio, a groundskeeper did not notice a pack of at least three coyotes until one latched onto his arm.  The attacking animal was with at least two others.  The man knocked the animals off him, escaped on a riding lawnmower, and drove himself to the hospital to have the arm bite wound and clawmarks treated and to get precautionary injections. Authorities responded, but the coyotes were not found.  Before the attack, the coyotes had been seen "almost every day" on the nearby golf course.
 On February 10, 2014, in Clement Park, Colorado, a woman was walking her dog in a park when a coyote approaching quickly.  She picked up her dog, but the coyote lunged at the pair.  The woman kicked the coyote, and it retreated.  Before the attack, others had noticed aggressive behavior from coyotes in that park.  After the incident, authorities killed five coyotes in the area.
 On March 14, 2014, a man walking his Yorkshire terrier in an alley behind his house in Yorba Linda, California was jumped on and knocked down by two coyotes, which took the dog and ran off.  The man had not seen the coyote when it suddenly jumped on his back.
 At about 7:00am on Tuesday, March 25, 2014, a woman walking her dog on a street in a residential neighborhood of Orangeburg, New York was attacked by a rabid coyote.  She used her jacket as a shield and escaped with the help of neighbors.  Police shot the coyote in a nearby backyard, EMTs treated her leg and took her to the hospital, and animal control officers collected the body and sent it to a New York State Troopers laboratory in Albany where it tested positive for rabies.
 On Monday, March 31, 2014, in a wooded area of Gibson Township, Pennsylvania, a man was bitten by a coyote while breaking up a fight between it and his dog.  He then shot the coyote.  The dog was unhurt, and the man began rabies treatments.
 On Thursday, May 14, 2014, in a wooded area on the campus of The University of Colorado, Boulder, a man was walking his dog on leash when it was attacked by a coyote.  While defending the dog, the man was bitten on the arm.  He kicked the coyote and swung a stick at it, and it ran away.  Before the attack, the coyote had been following them for some time.  After the attack, university authorities had warning signs put up and arranged for experts to study the matter.
 On Wednesday, May 14, 2014, in Bourne, Massachusetts, a man was attacked by a pack of three coyotes outside his house while defending his 5-year-old boxer.  The pair managed to drive the pack away, but not before sustaining bite wounds.  Before the attack, coyotes had killed the man's cats and attacked his neighbor's dog.  After the attack, the man called animal control officers, who agreed to visit the man's home to discuss the matter the following morning.
 On Thursday, September 25, 2014, in Okatie, South Carolina, a person was bitten by a rabid coyote.  It was the fourth coyote to test positive for rabies in Beaufort County in the year.
 On Saturday, October 4, 2014, about a mile and a half on a bicycle path from the Pleasant Hill Road entrance into Black River Wildlife Management Area a rabid yet apparently healthy coyote launched itself at a cyclist causing him to dismount.  During the ensuing fight, which lasted about two or three minutes, he used the bicycle to defend himself and to attack the coyote, which launched approximately eight or nine bite attempts, including open-mouthed leaps at his face.  At one moment he had to hold the bicycle and coyote off the ground with the coyote.  He finally slammed the bicycle on the paw and the coyote ran off.  Before the attack, the man was already tired from riding on the trail.  After the attack, he was so tired that he wouldn't have been able to fight much longer, and had difficulty fleeing due to exhaustion, coyote-mangled bicycle tires, and fear not letting him rest.  He was not bitten, but began precautionary treatment for rabies because of the coyote's saliva on his skin. Later that day, another park visitor had been approached by the coyote, and another cyclist was bitten on the leg.  The next day, they coyote was killed in a fight with a hunter, who was bitten.
 On Sunday, October 5, 2014, at 12:55pm, in Black River Wildlife Management Area in Chester Township, NJ, a hunter was bitten by a rabid coyote.  The hunter killed the animal before police and Fish and Wildlife officers could arrive.  The coyote tested positive for rabies.  Two days before the attack, a cyclist had been bitten and another attacked.
 On Tuesday, October 14, 2014, at about 9pm, while walking on a street in a wooded residential area of Clinton, Connecticut, a 35-year-old man was attacked by a canid, probably a coyote, but possibly a coywolf.  The animal leaped up and bit him severely on the face.  Before the attack, coyotes had been detected in the area.  After the attack, the man was given 14 stitches to the left of his nose, began precautionary rabies treatments, and an appointment to return for evaluation for plastic surgery.  The coyote was not found.
 On the morning of Monday, November 18, 2014, in Greenland, New Hampshire, a woman walking her retriever was attacked by a coyote in a field behind her house.  The coyote was not seen until it charged, biting both.  Her husband heard the commotion and drove his truck into the field and tried but failed to drive the animal away with it.  He had a gun, but the coyote was too close to the pair to aim at it, so he shot into the air trying but failing to scare it away.  The dog was being credited with finally driving the animal off, although the dog was bitten many times.  After the attack, the woman and dog were given medical treatment for multiple coyote bites, and both she and her husband started precautionary rabies treatments.  Before the attack, coyotes had been often heard, but not often seen in the area.
 On December 25, 2014, just after 6pm, in Fremont, California, the leg of a man walking his children to his car outside a home was bitten by an unhealthy-looking coyote. The man and the children escaped into the house. The man was treated at the hospital.  After the attack, a boy was bitten by the coyote about a block away, but saved by his father, and then a jogger on a nearby street was chased by the coyote which ran away when kicked, and police arrived, shot the coyote, and sent the body to be tested for rabies.
 On January 5, 2015, in Groveland, Massachusetts two men were attacked outside their houses. One of them had his four-year-old daughter with him.
 On January 20, 2015, in a residential area of Kensington, San Diego, California a woman was attacked while jogging.  While trying to run away, she was bitten on the leg.  She then stopped and shouted and acted threateningly toward the animal, and it eventually ran off.  After the attack, the bite wound was treated at the hospital and she began precautionary rabies treatments, the authorities stated the animal was a threat and were planning to remove it from the neighborhood.
 On April 6, 2015, a man was bitten on the calf by a coyote on the three-acre property outside his home in Saddle River, New Jersey. Earlier, the coyote had attacked a Labrador Retriever and left seven dead pups in the area. Initially, the man scared off the coyote, but when his back was turned, it bit him from behind. Authorities tracked and killed the animal, which tested positive for rabies.
 On July 11, 2016, a rabid urban coyote bit a person at Leita Thompson Memorial Park in Roswell, Georgia.
 On July 27, 2016, a coyote bit a fifty-three-year-old man in Manchester, New Jersey's Pow Mia Memorial Park. The man was taken to Ocean Medical Center in Brick, where doctors stitched up his wounds.
 On August 7, 2016, a woman was bitten by a coyote while walking her dog outside the Cowesett Hills apartment complex in Warwick, Rhode Island.
 On August 8, 2016, a rabid coyote bit a man who was walking in the woods with his two daughters in Lincoln, Pennsylvania.
 On October 2, 2016, a coyote bit two women and a domesticated dog in Wolcott, New York.
 On November 30, 2016, two neighborhood residents, a dog, and a trapper were bitten by a possibly rabid coyote in Ossining, New York.
 On January 11, 2017, a possibly rabid coyote bit a sixty-six-year-old man who walked with two other adults and their domestic dogs along the Columbia Trail in Long Valley, New Jersey. The man, who was bit on the buttocks and calf, fended it with a stick and police officers subsequently euthanized the animal.
 On February 27, 2017, a rabid coyote bit a man while jogging in Roswell, Georgia. While a neighbor called for the emergency number, the man pinned the animal to the ground for twenty minutes until paramedics came to his aid. He went to hospital for rabies treatment.
 On August 1, 2017, a coyote chased a woman who was riding a bicycle at Holmes Lake in Lincoln, Nebraska.
 On August 4, 2017, a coyote stalked a woman to the fence line to her house in Lakeview, New York. She subsequently shared photos of the animal as a warning to her neighbors.
 On August 16, 2017, a woman was mauled by a coyote along the Glens Falls Feeder Canal in Kingsbury, New York. She was taken to the Albany Medical Center by a helicopter for rabies treatment due to severe injuries.
 On September 5, 2017, an urban coyote stalked a man who was walking with his domestic dog at an archaeological state preserve in Glenwood, Iowa.
 On September 8, 2017, two coyotes attacked a forty-three-year-old woman and her cat in Santa Cruz, California. They took her cat's life, but the woman was sent to a hospital for rabies treatment.
 On September 14, 2017, a coyote pack in Saddle River, New Jersey ambushed a woman and tried to snatch her dog. A motorist in a sports utility vehicle honked the horn and stepped out to frighten the pack away.
 On October 8, 2017, a rabid coyote in Gervais, Oregon bit a man on a farm after walking up to him and sniffed him. After shooting the animal, the man was medically treated for rabies and released from a hospital.
 On October 20, 2017, a 57-year-old woman in Apple Valley, Minnesota was bitten by an urban coyote while jogging with her husband at Cedar Isle Park.
 On October 22, 2017, a 22-year-old man in Ashburnham, Massachusetts was bitten by a coyote when he mistook it for a domesticated dog. He was taken to Gardner's Heywood Hospital for rabies treatment afterwards.
 On November 20, 2017, a rabid coyote in North Attleborough, Massachusetts latched onto a woman's leg when it tried to crawl under her mobile home. She called the police and went back into her home after pointing out the animal to them.
 On December 17, 2017, a woman in Jamestown, Rhode Island was bitten a coyote while attempting to break up its fight between two large dogs at Beavertail State Park.
 On March 17, 2018, a possible rabid coyote in Brookville, Pennsylvania mauled a female nurse leaving her severely wounded and bleeding. She received eighteen stitches.
 On April 11, 2018, a rabid urban coyote in Wake Forest, North Carolina assaulted a man who took out the trash from his house. He subsequently recovered from his injuries.
 On April 18, 2018, a coyote in Rutland, Massachusetts pounced on a man who was tending three chickens in his backyard. He successfully fought against it.
 On May 15, 2018, a woman in Saugus, Massachusetts climbed a tree when she was assaulted by four coyotes while walking with her Labrador at Breakheart Reservation. She called 911 and fire fighters came to her aid.
 On May 19, 2018, a man and his seven-year-old daughter in Mocksville, North Carolina were assaulted by an urban coyote in their backyard. They received stitches afterwards.
 On May 26, 2018, an urban coyote lunged at a hiker and latched onto his boot in Jones County, Georgia's Hitchiti Experimental Forest. The hiker stabbed the animal with a knife and killed it.
 On July 7, 2018, an urban coyote in Tega Cay, South Carolina charged at a man who walking with his two dogs.
 On July 11, 2018, a man in Greenfield, Wisconsin fended two urban coyotes in his front yard to protect his German shepherd. He managed to escape severe injuries.
 On July 22, 2018, a man in Orland Park, Illinois was bitten by an urban coyote five times while walking with his service dog. His dog rescued him at that moment. The man subsequently went to a hospital for rabies shots.
 In September–October 2018, an urban coyote in Elwood, Illinois assaulted three adults. They were all sent to hospitals for rabies treatment. A police officer euthanized the animal after this incident.
 In October–November 2018, an aggressive urban coyote in Frisco, Texas stalked a few runners. It was frightened away by a passerby and a police siren in two different incidents.
 On December 26, 2018, an urban coyote in Fort Mill, South Carolina assaulted a man near a friend's home. The man fended the animal by kicking and stomping it, but fatally stabbing it with a knife as his final task.
 On January 26, 2019, a man in Kissimmee, Florida was assaulted by an urban coyote while walking down a street. He successfully knocked it out, but the animal later assaulted the man's wife and their neighbor who successfully kicked it away. The man's wife and their neighbor were sent to a hospital for rabies treatment.
 On January 29, 2019, a male adult jogger in Frisco, Texas was assaulted by an urban coyote. He successfully fought against it was and was treated for minor injuries.
 On February 15, 2019, an aggressive urban coyote in Fruitland Park, Florida assaulted a man and his dog. The man fought against it with a coffee cup.
 On April 1, 2019, a rabid coyote in Salisbury, Vermont assaulted an elderly couple on their farm. The couple successfully recovered in a Middlebury hospital due to rabies treatment.
 On April 6, 2019, a coyote in Braintree, Massachusetts assaulted a woman who was walking with her dog. Another person from her condominium complex noticed her injury and called the emergency number. She was sent to a hospital, but recovered at home.
 On April 17, 2019, a pack of coyotes in Kirtland, Ohio assaulted a woman who was hiking with her ten-year-old male German Shepherd at Lake Metroparks Farmpark.
 On July 19, 2019, a woman and her domesticated dog in Sanibel, Florida encountered two urban coyotes that surrounded them. They did not react to her efforts to frighten them away, so she and her dog fled and found a refuge at a nearby home until the small pack left their area.
 On August 2, 2019, a woman in Mahwah, New Jersey was mauled by a coyote multiple times. She successfully frightened the animal away by striking it with a baseball bat. The woman was transported to a local hospital and was treated for the mauling injuries.
 On September 1, 2019, a rabid urban coyote in Columbia, South Carolina assaulted four people and two domesticated dogs around an apartment complex.
 On September 16, 2019, a coyote assaulted a British woman walking her dog within the backyard of a home in Reading, Massachusetts. She had to miss her flight back to London due to rabies vaccination.
 On November 14 and November 18, 2019, an "unusually aggressive" coyote in the Rutgers Ecological Preserve, Rutgers University, New Brunswick, New Jersey attacked and bit two separate people occasions, nonlethally. The coyote approached Rutgers Police officers, and was killed. It tested negative for rabies.
 On January 8, 2020, a thirty-two-year-old man in Chicago, Illinois told authorities he was attacked by what he thought was an urban coyote, while walking in the 700 block of North Fairbanks Court. He was treated at the hospital for a scratch on his buttocks.
 On January 16, 2020, a police officer in Columbus, Ohio was mauled by a coyote when he intended to assist a stranded driver. The police officer was subsequently hospitalized after this incident.
 On January 20, 2020, a rabid coyote in Kensington, New Hampshire lunged at a sixty-two-year-old woman and her domesticated dogs on her front porch.
 On January 28, 2020, a mountain coyote mauled a forty-three-year-old woman who was cross-country snow skiing in Wyoming's Yellowstone National Park. Witnesses took her to Canyon Visitor Educational Center. Park rangers subsequently transported the victim to Mammoth Hot Springs and later to a medical facility.
 On February 12, 2020, a Mearns coyote in Saddlebrooke, Arizona bit a seventy-seven-year-old man's leg. The man stood on his porch at the time of this incident. He was sent to a local hospital or possible rabies treatment and was subsequently released to return home.
 On February 13, 2020, a Mearns coyote assaulted an elderly woman who was walking with her domesticated dog at Arroyo Chico Park in Tucson, Arizona.
 On February 25, 2020, an urban coyote in Coral Springs, Florida pursued a twenty-year-old male jogger at Three Mountains Natural Area. He injured his leg while being chased by the animal was subsequently sent to a hospital for medical treatment.
 On March 1, 2020, a small pack of urban coyotes in Southborough, Massachusetts assaulted a woman and her dog. Her husband successfully defended with a broom.
 On October 1, 2020, two women and a boy in Rockville, Maryland were pursued by a rabid coyote. All three victims were treated for rabies afterwards.
 On May 16, 2021, an urban coyote in Bolingbrook, Illinois nibbled a woman's foot while she was walking her dog.
 On June 14, 2021, an urban coyote in Boise, Idaho stalked a woman walked with her three dogs. They successfully evaded this assault.
 On July 29, 2021, a woman in Provincetown, Massachusetts was stalked and pursued by a coyote on Cape Cod's Race Point Beach. Two nearby fishermen fended it off at that moment.

Non-fatal coyote attacks on adults in Canada 
 On February 10, 2010, in Saint-Charles, New Brunswick, a woman brought her puppy on leash outside in the middle of the night to relieve himself, when a coyote suddenly appeared and made for the dog.  The woman tossed the puppy about ten feet away to save it, and the coyote turned on her.  The pair fought for more than ten minutes until the woman managed to land a left hook to the jaw, and the animal finally ran off.   The woman was not seriously injured, although she needed a bandage on the knuckles of her left hand and a tetanus shot.
 In September, 2012, in Kamloops, British Columbia, a man on a bicycle was attacked by an urban coyote and forced to stop and fend it off.  He used his bicycle to defend himself and stood his ground and behaved aggressively and the coyote soon ran off.
 On May 21, 2013, in Kamloops, British Columbia, an urban coyote attacked a camper in a sleeping bag, but he was not in a tent. The man drove himself to the hospital to get his wounds stitched.  The coyote was described as somewhat large and healthy-looking.  Conservation officers began hunting for the coyote.
 On December 11, 2013, in Summerland, British Columbia, a pack of three urban coyotes surrounded and attacked a woman walking her friend's Labradoodle. Although her heavy winter coat took most of the damage, she suffered defensive wounds to the left hand. As a result of this attack, authorities began a cull of area coyotes.
 On January 20, 2014, in Markham, Ontario, two women were bitten by wild canids. Coyotes were suspected.
 On Monday June 23, 2014, at about 4:00pm, in a residential area Thornhill, Ontario, two women were attacked by two wild canids, thought to be coyotes, coywolves, or coydogs, or lupine feral dogs, biting one of them on the leg and the other on the hip.  Both were treated for injuries and began preventive treatment for rabies.  Earlier that day, in a nearby area, the same two coyotes had tried to attack at least three other people who escaped into their houses and called police, who arrived and shot at the animals, driving them off while perhaps wounding one of them.  At last report, the animals had not been caught, and officials had cancelled city-run outdoor activities and were advising residents to be careful when venturing outdoors, especially with children or domesticated animals.
 On Saturday, July 19, 2014, at about 4:00pm, outside her home in Gravenhurst, Ontario, a woman was exercising her two American Bulldogs when the female dog, which had a neurological disorder, was attacked by an eastern coyote. The woman than attacked the wild dog, but it fought her off and returned to attack the dog three times.  Then, the male dog managed to slip its collar and chase off the coyote.  The woman suffered multiple tooth drags and scratches.  After the attack, the doctor ordered the woman to begin a series of painful rabies treatments, and had difficulty determining which authority or authorities to properly file a report to, and the neighbors began carrying clubs when outdoors.  Before the attack, the wild animal had been following them for a short time.
 On January 31, 2017, three coyotes attacked a man who took his dog for a walk in Alliston, Ontario. The man's dog was able to fend off the coyotes. Neither the man or his dog had any serious injuries.
 On May 13, 2017, a man on a bicycle ride at Country Hills Golf Club in Calgary, Alberta used his bicycle to fend off an aggressive urban coyote that attacked another man's dog, and subsequently escorted them away from the assault.
 On May 19, 2017, morning, two urban coyotes attacked a man who took his dog for a walk in Calgary, Alberta. While the man avoided injury, the small dog was killed. That afternoon, a walker suffered another attack around 4:30pm. It seems that yet another attack had occurred the Saturday before, likely by the same pair of animals. The animals have been observed in the small pocket of green (51.149373, -114.089617) for a couple of years, and to feed from a golf clubhouse nearby. So far, city officials have chosen just to close the walking path instead of relocating the aggressive animals from that limited habitat, despite the threat to golfers and a community children play ground just 900m away.
 On August 31, 2017, a coyote stalked a young woman and her two children at Round Ray Beach in Shelburne, Nova Scotia. The woman screamed for her son to come to her, made roaring noises, and clapped her hands to frighten the animal away. It looked up and relocated to the grasses beside the beach.
 On January 8, 2018, a coyote assaulted a woman and her miniature pinscher in Markham, Ontario. Her neighbor rescued them by defending them from the wild animal with a snow shovel.
 On April 30, 2019, six coyotes in Mississauga, Ontario charged at a woman and her dog on the Etobicoke Creek Trail. The pack mauled her pant legs as she tried to fend them off with a big stick and shouting herself hoarse. The woman even used pepper spray, but the pack did not relent. Because the woman could not manage to watch after her dog while trying to rescue herself, she told her dog to flee. Her dog managed to lose the pursuing pack by running in a zig-zag pattern and at one point jumping into the water nearby. A passerby also assisted her in frightening them away as she called out to a person for help.
 On May 30, 2020, an urban coyote in Riverside South, Ottawa mauled a seventy-four-year-old man.
 On May 13, 2021, an urban coyote in British Columbia mauled a woman on her leg while she was jogging around Stanley Park.
 On June 20, 2021, a senior woman in Nolan Hill, Alberta was mauled on her leg by an urban coyote. She was transported to Rockyview General Hospital afterwards.
 On June 21, 2021, a forty-one-year-old woman and her five-year-old daughter in Nolan Hill, Alberta were mauled by an urban coyote.
 On June 27, 2021, a fifty-five-year-old woman in Tuscany, Calgary, Alberta was mauled by an urban coyote while communicating with her sister on the phone from her front porch.
 On July 7, 2021, an urban coyote in British Columbia's Stanley Park mauled a man who was practicing yoga. In addition, it mauled a runner and a woman who came to the runner's aid. All three of them were subsequently transported to a hospital for recovery.
 On August 11, 2021, a woman was mauled by an urban coyote while jogging in British Columbia's Stanley Park. She only suffered a few minor injuries.

Non-fatal coyote attacks on adults in Mexico 
 In June 2018, a coyote in Mexicali assaulted a family that illegally kept it for a pet.

See also 
 Death of Azaria Chamberlain
 Death of Kenton Joel Carnegie
 Dingo attack
 List of fatal dog attacks in the United States
 List of wolf attacks in North America
 List of large carnivores known to prey on humans

References

Canid attacks
Coyotes in human culture